Keta is a coastal town in the Volta Region of Ghana. It is the capital of the Keta Municipal District.

Keta is the sixty-first most populous settlement in Ghana in terms of population, with a population of 23,207.  Parts of the town were devastated by sea erosion between the 1960s and 1980s.  Keta is mentioned in Maya Angelou's All God's Children Need Traveling Shoes.

History

Keta was settled by the Anlo Ewe, a sub-group of the Ewe people who, in the 17th century, migrated to the area from Ketu, in Benin via Adja Tado and Notsie in Togo.

Keta was an important trading post between the 14th and the late 20th centuries. The town attracted the interest of the Danish, because they felt they could establish a base here without interference from rival European nations. Their first initiative was to place a factory at Keta to sell alcohol.

In 1792, a war between Anloga and Keta broke out. Majority of the original people then migrated across the lagoon to Klikor to establish the Somey State with Agbozume as its capital. Keta was then repopulated with people from  other areas of the surrounding communities.

Faced with the threat of war between Peki and an alliance of the Ashanti and the Akwamu, the North German Missionary Society (also known as the Bremen Missionaries) moved the focus of their activities from Peki to Keta. Their missionaries, Dauble and Plessing, landed at nearby Dzelukofe on September 2, 1853.

Historically Keta was also known as Quittah or Agudzeawo (Easterners in old Ewe) and was assigned B27 as a postal mark.

From 1874 Hausa Constabulary were based at Keta, and soon there grew to be a community of Hausa traders in the town.

The author, and then colonial Civil Servant, Dr. R. Austin Freeman served as a medical officer (Assistant Surgeon) here in 1887 during which an epidemic of black water fever killed forty per cent of the European population.

Etymology: Ewe language- Ke:ta - 
Head of the sand

Ecology
In 1784, Fort Prinzenstein, like most slave trade forts, was built by the sea's edge. However the sea had retreated by about 600 ft by 1907. Since then Keta has been subject to sustained erosion. The Bremen Factory and Coconut plantation, which were close to the high water mark in 1907, had been swept away by the sea by 1924. The erosion has now advanced as far as Queen Street and started to wear away the Fort.

Close to Keta is the famous town of Woe, known for the notable lighthouse called Cape St. Paul Lighthouse  on the beach that is believed to guide ships away from a mythical massive underwater mountain. This lighthouse is also thought to be the oldest in Ghana.

Keta Lagoon

Keta Lagoon is the largest lagoon in Ghana with a water area of 300 km2. This is located in a larger wetlands protected area of 1200 km2. It is a stopping point for a large number of migratory birds and provides a breeding ground for sea turtles.
The Keta Lagoon is known for its immense quantity of salt.

Festival
Keta Sometutuza Festivalhogbetsotso za

Etymology

Keta:  (Ewe language ).  Head/top of the sand.
These words were uttered by Torgbui Wenya,the founder of Anlo State when he sighted the sand dunes at the sea shore. Wenya had separated from his kinsmen in nearby Wheta to establish his own settlement at Anloga.
Historically, the people of Keta were also known as Agudzeawo - meaning Easterners because they are east of Anloga.

Oil
Oil has been found at the Keta Basin. However, experts are against the exploitation because it will be on land which lead to the destruction of land and lives, as well as some sources of livelihood.

Education 
The city can boast of notably finest schools in the Volta Region.
 Keta Senior High Technical School
 Keta Business College

Attractions 
Keta community has a few tourist attractions which one can enjoy  whiles in the town.

 Aborigines Beach Resort
 Keta Lagoon Rest Stop
 Keta Lagoon Resort
 Fort Prinzenstein
 Gobah Beach
 Emancipation Beach Resort

See also
 Dzelukofe
 Anloga

References

(15) Felix Kuadugah- contributor. History of Agbozume and Keta.

Populated places in the Volta Region
Ramsar sites in Ghana